Moolack Mountain can refer to two mountains in the United States:

Moolack Mountain (Idaho), in Boise County
Moolack Mountain (Oregon), in Lane County

See also
Moolock Mountain, in King County, Washington

References